Schinia sexplagiata is a moth of the family Noctuidae. It is found in western North America, east up to west Texas.

The wingspan is about 21 mm.

The larvae feed on Ambrosia psilostachya.

External links
Images
Butterflies and Moths of North America

Schinia
Moths of North America
Moths described in 1891